Lacerta strigata, the Caucasus emerald lizard, five-streaked lizard, or Caspian green lizard, is a species of lizard in the family Lacertidae.
It is found in Georgia, Armenia, Azerbaijan, Turkmenistan, Turkey, and Iran.

References

 
Fauna of Georgia (country)
Reptiles described in 1831
Taxa named by Karl Eichwald